Youngblood is the second studio album by Carl Wilson.  It was released in 1983 by Caribou Records. It was re-issued on CD on September 21, 2010.

Track listing
All tracks composed by Carl Wilson and Myrna Smith; except where indicated.

"What More Can I Say" – 3:26
"She's Mine" – 3:04
"Givin' You Up" (Carl Wilson, Myrna Smith, Jerry Schilling) – 4:41
"One More Night Alone" (Billy Hinsche) – 3:05
"Rockin' All Over the World" (J.C. Fogerty) – 3:00
"What You Do to Me" (John Hall, Johanna Hall) – 3:56
"Young Blood" (Jerry Leiber, Mike Stoller, Doc Pomus) – 2:42
"Of the Times" – 4:07
"Too Early to Tell" (Carl Wilson, Myrna Smith, John Daly) – 2:51
"If I Could Talk to Love" – 4:10
"Time" – 3:00
"Givin' You Up (Single Edit)" [CD bonus track] (Carl Wilson, Myrna Smith, Jerry Schilling) - 4:14

Personnel
Carl Wilson – guitar, lead vocals, backing vocals, harmony vocals on "Rockin' All Over the World"
Jeff Baxter, Geo Conner – guitar, backing vocals
Elliott Randall, Trevor Veitch, John Daly – guitar
Billy Hinsche – keyboards, guitar, backing vocals
Ed Greene, Alan Krigger, Vinnie Colaiuta – drums
Neil Stubenhaus, Gerald Johnson – bass guitar
Jim Ehinger – piano, keyboards
Nicky Hopkins – piano
Lon Price, Bryan Cummings, Ron Viola – tenor saxophone
Jerry Peterson – baritone saxophone
Lee Thornburg – tenor saxophone, flugelhorn
Myrna Smith-Schilling – backing vocals
Timothy B. Schmit – backing vocals
Burton Cummings – backing vocals on “Rockin’ All Over the World” and “Young Blood”
Billie Barman – backing vocals
Phyllis St. James – backing vocals
Krohn McHenry – backing vocals

Technical personnel
Jeff Baxter – producer
Larold Rebhun – engineer

Charts
Singles

Billboard (North America)

References

1983 albums
Carl Wilson albums
Caribou Records albums
Albums produced by Jeff Baxter